Valerie Hackl (born 29 August 1982) is an Austrian businesswoman an the managing director of Austro Control. In 2019, she briefly served as minister of infrastructure.

References 

1982 births
Living people
21st-century Austrian businesswomen
21st-century Austrian businesspeople
Women government ministers of Austria
Government ministers of Austria
Politicians from Vienna
Businesspeople from Vienna
21st-century Austrian women politicians
21st-century Austrian politicians